How Harry Became a Tree is a 2001 drama film directed by Goran Paskaljević.

Plot
In rural Ireland in 1924, Harry Maloney (Colm Meany), believing "a man is measured by his enemies", nurses an unjustified enmity for George O'Flaherty, who owns the local pub and most of the businesses in the area and is the local matchmaker. When Harry's son Gus (Cillian Murphy), upon whom Harry regularly heaps mental and verbal abuse falls for George's maidservant, Eileen, George helps put the two together. George's seduction of Eileen gives Harry the opportunity to create a scandal, despite the effect on his own family.

Cast 
 Colm Meaney - Harry
 Adrian Dunbar - George
 Cillian Murphy - Gus
 Kerry Condon - Eileen
 Pat Laffan - Father O'Connor
 Gail Fitzpatrick - Margaret

References

External links 

Italian drama films
French drama films
British drama films
Irish drama films
2001 drama films
2001 films
Films set in Ireland
Films set in 1924
English-language Italian films
English-language French films
English-language Irish films
2000s English-language films
2000s British films
2000s French films